Crassula namaquensis is a species of succulent plant in the genus Crassula native to South Africa. Easily confused with some forms of Crassula tecta and Crassula sericea, this species has rounded to elongated leaves that are usually blue, covered in fine hairs, and form clumps.

Subspecies 
There are three accepted subspecies.

 Crassula namaquensis subsp. comptonii 
 Crassula namaquensis subsp. lutea 
 Crassula namaquensis subsp. namaquensis

References

namaquensis
Plants described in 1898